"A Virtuoso's Collection" is the final short story in Mosses from an Old Manse by Nathaniel Hawthorne.  It was first published in Boston Miscellany of Literature and Fashion, I (May 1842), 193-200.  
The story references a number of historical and mythical figures, items, beasts, books, etc. as part of a museum collection. Some scholars regard the real-life museum of the East India Marine Society in Salem, Massachusetts, as a model for Hawthorne's fictional museum. The narrator is led through the collection by the virtuoso himself who turns out to be the Wandering Jew.

The collection 

 Opportunity, by the ancient sculptor Lysippus
 The wolf that devoured Little Red Riding Hood
 The she-wolf that suckled Romulus and Remus
 Edmund Spenser's 'milk-white lamb' which Una led in The Faerie Queene
 Alexander the Great's Bucephalus
 Don Quixote's horse Rosinante
 The donkey from William Wordsworth's Peter Bell: A Tale
 The donkey from Book of Numbers chapter 22 that was beaten by Balaam
 Argus, Ulysses' dog
 Cerberus
 The fox from Aesop's fable The Fox Who Lost Its Tail
 Dr. Samuel Johnson's cat Hodge
 The cat who saved Muhammad from a snake, or Muezza, the Prophet's pet.  Perhaps both cats are in the collection.
 Thomas Gray's inspiration for the poem "Ode on the Death of a Favourite Cat Drowned in a Tub of Goldfishes".  The cat, Selima, belonged to Horace Walpole
 Sir Walter Scott's cat Hinse
 Puss in Boots
 Bast, the Egyptian sun and war goddess, in her cat form
 George Gordon Byron's pet bear
 The Erymanthean Boar
 St. George's Dragon. See Saint George and the Dragon
 Python
 The serpent which tempted Eve
 The horns of the stag poached by Shakespeare
 The shell of the tortoise that supposedly killed Aeschylus
 Apis, an Egyptian bull-deity
 "The cow with the crumpled horn" from the nursery rhyme "This Is The House That Jack Built"
 The cow that jumped over the moon from the nursery rhyme "Hey Diddle Diddle"
 A griffin
 The dove that brought the olive branch to Noah to signify that the flood was receding
 Grip, the raven that belonged to Barnaby Rudge and later inspired Edgar Allan Poe's "The Raven"
 The raven in which the soul of George I of Great Britain revisited his love, Melusine von der Schulenburg, Duchess of Kendal after his death
 Minerva's owl
 The vulture (or eagle) that daily ate Prometheus's liver
 The sacred ibis of Egypt
 One of the Stymphalian birds shot by Hercules. See Labours of Hercules
 Percy Bysshe Shelley's skylark from "To a Skylark"
 William Cullen Bryant's water-fowl from "To a Waterfowl"
 A pigeon, preserved by Nathaniel Parker Willis, from the belfry of Old South Church in Boston
 The albatross from Samuel Taylor Coleridge's The Rime of the Ancient Mariner
 A domestic goose from the temple of Juno on the Capitoline Hill.  Livy claimed these geese saved Rome from the Gauls around 390 BC.
 Robinson Crusoe's parrot
 A live phoenix
 A footless bird of paradise or Huma bird
 The peacock that once contained the soul of Pythagoras

Editions

References

Bibliography
Goluboff, Benjamin (1995). "'A Virtuoso's Collection': Hawthorne, History, and the Wandering Jew".  Nathaniel Hawthorne Review 1995 Spring; 21 (1): 14-25. ISSN 0890-4197.
McMurray, Price (2002). "'I Would Write on the Lintels of the Door-Post, Whim': History and Idealism in A Virtuoso's Collection. Conference of College Teachers of English Studies 2002 September; 67: 32-42. ISSN 0092-8151.

Short stories by Nathaniel Hawthorne
1842 short stories
Works originally published in The Boston Miscellany